James Mure-Campbell, 5th Earl of Loudoun (11 February 1726 – 28 April 1786) was a Scottish aristocrat, soldier and MP.

He was born the only son of Hon. Sir James Campbell, M.P. of Lawers, Perthshire and Lady Jean Boyle. He assumed the name of Mure in 1729 on succeeding to the Rowallan estate near Kilmaurs, Ayrshire of his grandmother Jean Mure, the Countess of Glasgow, heiress of the family of Mure of Rowallan.

He inherited the Lawers estate near Perth in 1745 on the death of his father at the Battle of Fontenoy and succeeded his cousin to the title of 5th Earl of Loudoun in 1782.

He served in the British Army, reaching the rank of major general by 1781 and represented Ayrshire in Parliament from 1754 to 1761.

He married Flora Macleod, daughter of John Macleod of Raasay; their only child Flora Mure-Campbell succeeded to the title as 6th Countess of Loudoun.

See also
Earl of Loudoun

References

Burke's Peerage – The Campbells of Loudoun
thepeerage.com

1726 births
1786 deaths
Earls of Loudoun
British Army major generals
Members of the Parliament of Great Britain for Scottish constituencies
British MPs 1754–1761